is a song by Japanese singer/songwriter Chisato Moritaka, from her 1989 studio album Hijitsuryokuha Sengen. The lyrics were written by Moritaka and the music was composed by Hideo Saitō.

Moritaka re-recorded the song and uploaded the video on her YouTube channel on February 12, 2013. This version is also included in Moritaka's 2013 self-covers DVD album Love Vol. 4.

Noriko Katō version 

Japanese singer Noriko Katō released her cover of "Kondo Watashi Doko ka Tsurete itte Kudasai yo" as her debut single on July 25, 1992. It was used as the ending theme of the ANB TV series Bin Bin House.

The lyrics were written by Moritaka and the music was composed by Hideo Saitō. Moritaka recorded her version of the song in her 1999 compilation album Harvest Time.

The music video features Katō as a waitress at a restaurant near a construction site. She is madly in love with a construction worker named Kōji to the point where she gives him larger servings of his order than his co-workers. An embarrassed Kōji stands up and he and everyone in the restaurant stare at Katō before the song plays on the television, with Katō singing and dancing on a blue screen background.

The single peaked at No. 69 on Oricon's singles chart. It also earned her a New Artist Award nomination at the 34th Japan Record Awards.

Track listing 
All lyrics are written by Chisato Moritaka; all music is composed and arranged by Hideo Saitō.

Chart positions

References 

1989 songs
1992 debut singles
Japanese-language songs
Chisato Moritaka songs
Songs with lyrics by Chisato Moritaka
Songs with music by Hideo Saitō (musician, born 1958)
Warner Music Japan singles